The 1972 Long Beach State 49ers football team represented California State University, Long Beach during the 1972 NCAA University Division football season.

Cal State Long Beach competed in the Pacific Coast Athletic Association. The team was led by fourth year head coach Jim Stangeland, and played the majority of their home games at Anaheim Stadium in Anaheim, California. One home game was played at Veterans Stadium adjacent to the campus of Long Beach City College in Long Beach, California, and another at Falcon Stadium at Cerritos College in Norwalk, California. They finished the season with a record of five wins and six losses (5–6, 1–3 PCAA).

Schedule

NFL Draft
One 49er player was selected in the 1973 NFL Draft.

Notes

References

Long Beach State
Long Beach State 49ers football seasons
Long Beach State 49ers football